Royal Suite is a Canadian comedy-drama television miniseries which aired on CBC Television in 1976.

Premise
This series is set at a hotel, featuring the situations of its various staff members and guests.

Scheduling
This half-hour series was broadcast Wednesdays at 10:30 p.m. from 6 October to 29 December 1976.

See also
 Plaza Suite

References

External links
 
 

CBC Television original programming
1976 Canadian television series debuts
1976 Canadian television series endings